Tomoko Akane  is a Japanese jurist and a current judge at the International Criminal Court (ICC) for Japan.

Professional career 
After graduation from university she became a public prosecutor in 1982.  During her career, she assumed posts at different levels of the justice system.  She chose to become a public prosecutor due to the lack of opportunities the private sector provided for women and prosecutor since she wanted to be involved in serving justice to victims and criminals. Akane was the chief prosecutor of the Hakodate district in Hokkaido between 2010 and 2012, and was elected the public prosecutor of the Supreme Court of Japan in 2012. Akane was also a professor in Criminal Justice Practice at both, the Chukyo University Law School and the Nagoya University Law School between 2005 and 2009. In Nagoya, she was also researching in the field of Criminal justice reform between 2005 and 2006. She was the head of the International Cooperation Department (ICD) in the Japanese Ministry of Justice between 2009 and 2010. Her involvement in the activities of the United Nations Asia and Far East Institute for the Prevention of Crime Treatment of Offenders (UNAFEI) was for seven years and she assumed as the director of the UNAFEI between July 2013 and October 2014.

Judge at the International Criminal Court 
She was nominated as a candidate to the ICC in April 2016 by the Government of Japan and elected as a judge of the ICC on the 4 December 2017 by the Assembly of State Parties in New York. She assumed her post in March 2018 for a tenure of nine years. As a judge at the ICC she is mainly assigned to the Pre-Trial II.

Fields involved 
In her career she has learnt that it is not only important to punish the criminals, but also to encourage them not to participate in criminal activity again. During her work for the UNAFEI, she was twice deployed to Kenya, where she was involved in the training of probation officers.

References 

Japanese judges of international courts and tribunals
Japanese jurists
Japanese prosecutors
Living people
Year of birth missing (living people)